Circus Mircus are a Georgian progressive rock band. The band mostly plays experimental music, mixing numerous genres, each representing a life experience and the "inner world" of each member. They represented  in the Eurovision Song Contest 2022 with the song "Lock Me In", placing 18th in the second semi-final, failing to qualify for the final. 

Circus Mircus consists of four members, named as Ludwig Ramírez (Shota Darakhvelidze), Igor Von Lichtenstein (Nika Kocharov), Bavonc Gevorkyan (Sandro Sulakvelidze), and Iago Waitman (Archil Sulakvelidze). The band uses pseudonyms.

History 

The band was supposedly formed at the end of 2020 in Tbilisi, when three local circus academy dropouts became friends and left the academy to start their own band. According to a member of the band, the three "weren't good enough, [we were] probably the worst in the crew, [and] that's why we became friends." 

Allegedly, the fourth member was added when they “picked [him] up from the street and promoted [him] to bass player." While the names of the group's members have since been revealed, playing with identity is significant to Circus Mircus' group persona. They state, “identities are so old fashioned and we don’t care about faces, as you can always be whatever you want to be, as long as you work hard."

On 14 November 2021, it was announced that the group had been internally chosen by Georgian Public Broadcasting to represent the country in the Eurovision Song Contest 2022. Their competing song "Lock Me In" was released on 9 March 2022. They performed 5th in the second semi final, and came 18th (last) with 22 points; 13 from the professional juries and 9 from the televote, failing to qualify for the grand final.

Their songs "Weather Support," "23:34," and "Rocha" were nominated for an Electronauts Award in the category of "Best Music Video".

Discography

Singles

References

External Links 

 Official Website
 Official Facebook
 Official Spotify
 Official YouTube

Musical groups from Georgia (country)
Musical groups established in 2020
2020 establishments in Georgia (country)
Eurovision Song Contest entrants for Georgia (country)
Eurovision Song Contest entrants of 2022
Rock music groups from Georgia (country)